Tony Masters may refer to:
 Taskmaster (character), a Marvel Comics supervillain
 Tony Masters, a character in the Oz TV series
 Anthony Masters (1919–1990), British production designer